The Mansion is an Australian television comedy based upon news and current affairs. It is hosted by Michael Chamberlin and Charlie Pickering and features Kate McLennan and Justin Kennedy, It premiered on The Comedy Channel on Thursday 3 April 2008 at 8:30 pm.

The fictional backstory of The Mansion is that its previous host of The Mansion was one of the word's richest and most sexually potent news magnates, Jebediah McNews. The series finale of the Mansion aired on 19 June 2008 with a 'best of' episode airing on 26 June.

References

External links
 

2008 Australian television series debuts
2008 Australian television series endings
Australian comedy television series
Australian television news shows
The Comedy Channel original programming